Kenneth Jesse Tobey (March 23, 1917 – December 22, 2002) was an extremely prolific American actor who performed in hundreds of productions during a career that spanned more than half a century, including his role as the star of the 1957-1960 Desilu Productions TV series Whirlybirds.

Early years
Tobey was born in 1917 in Oakland, California. Following his graduation from high school in 1935, he entered the University of California, Berkeley, with intentions to pursue a career in law, until he began to dabble in acting at the school's theater. His stage experience there led to a drama scholarship, a year-and-a-half of study at New York City's Neighborhood Playhouse, where his classmates included fellow actors Gregory Peck, Eli Wallach, and Tony Randall.

During World War II, Tobey joined the United States Army Air Forces, serving in the Pacific as a rear gunner aboard a B-25 bomber.  Throughout the 1940s, with the exception of his time in military service, Tobey acted on Broadway and in summer stock. After appearing in a 1943 film short, The Man of the Ferry, he made his Hollywood film debut in the 1947 Hopalong Cassidy Western Dangerous Venture. He then went on to appear in scores of features and on numerous television series. In the 1949 film Twelve O' Clock High, he is the negligent airbase sentry who is dressed down by General Frank Savage (played by Gregory Peck). That same year, Tobey performed in a brief comedy bit in another film, I Was a Male War Bride starring Cary Grant.  His performance in that minor part caught the attention of director Howard Hawks, who promised to use the 32-year-old actor in something more substantial.

The Thing from Another World
In 1951, Tobey was cast in Howard Hawks' production The Thing from Another World.  In this classic sci-fi film he portrays Captain Patrick Hendry, a United States Air Force pilot, who at the North Pole leads a scientific outpost's dogged defense against an alien portrayed by James Arness, later the star of the television series Gunsmoke.  Tobey's performance in Hawks' film garnered the actor other parts in science-fiction movies in the 1950s, usually reprising his role as a military officer, such as in The Beast from 20,000 Fathoms (1953) and It Came from Beneath the Sea (1956).

Television

Tobey appeared in the 1952 episode "Counterfeit Plates" on the CBS series Biff Baker, U.S.A., an espionage drama starring Alan Hale, Jr.  He portrayed a plainclothes policeman in a 1953 episode of the anthology series Schlitz Playhouse of the Stars starring Angela Lansbury and Morris Ankrum, including a lengthy fistfight between Tobey's and Ankrum's characters. He was cast in the 1954-1955 CBS legal drama The Public Defender starring Reed Hadley. He guest-starred in three episodes of NBC's Western anthology series Frontier. His Frontier roles were as Wade Trippe in "In Nebraska" (1955) and then as Gabe Sharp in "Out from Texas" and "The Hostage" (1956). In 1955, he also portrayed legendary frontiersman Jim Bowie on ABC's Davy Crockett, a Walt Disney production, with Fess Parker in the title role. After Bowie's death in the series at the Battle of the Alamo, Tobey played a second character, Jocko, in the two final episodes of Davy Crockett.

Tobey then, in 1957, appeared in the syndicated religion anthology series Crossroads in the role of Mr. Alston in the episode "Call for Help", and as Jim Callahan in "Bandit Chief" in the syndicated Western series The Sheriff of Cochise.  Later that same year, Tobey starred in the television series Whirlybirds, a successful CBS and then-syndicated adventure produced by Desilu Studios.  In it, he played the co-owner of a helicopter charter service, along with  Craig Hill. Whirlybirds was a major hit in the United States and abroad, with 111 episodes filmed through 1960. It remained in syndication worldwide for many years.

In 1958, Tobey also appeared as John Wallach in the episode "$50 for a Dead Man" in Jeff Richards's NBC Western series Jefferson Drum. In 1960, he guest-starred in the episode "West of Boston" of another NBC Western series, Overland Trail, starring William Bendix and Doug McClure. Also in 1960, he appeared as Colonel Lake on Death Valley Days and on ABC's Western The Rebel, starring Nick Adams. Tobey made three guest appearances on Perry Mason, twice in 1960 and once in 1962 as Jack Alvin, a deputy district attorney.  On the long-running Western series Gunsmoke, he portrayed a cruel, knife-wielding buffalo hunter in the 1960 episode titled "The Worm".  Tobey in 1962 also guest-starred on another Western series, Lawman, playing the character Duncan Clooney, an engineer who seeks to move a shipment of nitroglycerin through Laramie, Wyoming. When the town is evacuated to allow passage of the explosives, two of Clooney's employees decide they will take advantage of the situation to rob the bank.

Tobey also guest-starred in Jack Lord's 1962-1963 ABC adventure series about a rodeo circuit rider, Stoney Burke. In 1967, he performed on the series Lassie, in the episode "Lure of the Wild", playing a retired forest ranger who tames a local coyote.  He also appeared as a slave owner named Taggart in "The Wolf Man", a 1967 episode of Daniel Boone, starring Fess Parker.  A few of the many other series in which Tobey later performed include Adam-12 (1969), S.W.A.T. (1975) as a desk sergeant who disapporves of Officer Luca's disheveled looks, Gibbsville (1976), MV Klickitat (1978), Emergency! (1975), and  Night Court (1985).

He became a semiregular on the NBC drama series I Spy as the field boss of agents Robinson and Scott, played by Robert Culp and comedian Bill Cosby. Christian Nyby, director of The Thing From Another World, often directed those episodes. Tobey also portrayed a ship's captain on the Rockford Files starring James Garner in an episode titled "There's One in Every Port".

Other films
In 1957, Tobey portrayed a sheriff in The Vampire (a film that some sources today often confuse with the 1935 production Mark of the Vampire).  That year, he also appeared in a more prestigious film, serving as a featured supporting character with John Wayne and Maureen O'Hara, the co-stars of John Ford's The Wings of Eagles.  In that film, Tobey, with his naturally red hair on display in vibrant Metrocolor, portrays a highly competitive United States Army Air Service officer.  In one memorable scene, he has the distinction of shoving a piece of gooey cake into John Wayne's face, whose character is a rival United States Navy aviation officer. Not surprisingly, a room-wrecking brawl ensues.

Tobey's work over the next several decades was increasingly involved in television productions.  He did, though, continue to perform in a range of feature films, such as Stark Fear, Marlowe starring James Garner as Raymond Chandler's detective Philip Marlowe, Billy Jack starring Tom Laughlin, Walking Tall starring Joe Don Baker, The Howling, the war movie MacArthur (in which he portrays Admiral "Bull" Halsey), Airplane!, Gremlins, Big Top Pee-wee starring Paul Reubens, and Gremlins 2: The New Batch.

Broadway
Although Tobey had a busy acting career in films and on television, he also periodically returned to the stage.  In 1964, he began a long run on Broadway opposite Sammy Davis, Jr., in the musical version of Clifford Odets' play Golden Boy. Some of his other Broadway credits are As You Like It, Sunny River, Janie, Sons and Soldiers, A New Life, Suds in Your Eye, The Cherry Orchard, and Truckline Cafe.

Politics
Tobey was an active member of the Republican party in southern California. He campaigned for Eisenhower in the 1952 presidential election and again in 1956. He said he voted for Richard Nixon in 1960, Barry Goldwater in 1964 and Richard Nixon again in 1968. Many of his close friends, including John Charles Moffitt, Lela Rogers, Robert Montgomery and Ronald Reagan, were "friendly witnesses" for HUAC during the days of the Hollywood blacklist.

Later years
As his long career drew to a close, Tobey still received acting jobs from people who had grown up watching his performances in sci-fi films of the 1950s, particularly Joe Dante, who included the veteran actor in his stock company of reliable players.  Two appearances on the sitcom Night Court came the same way, through fans of his work. Along with other character actors who had been in 1950s sci-fi and horror films (John Agar, Robert O. Cornthwaite, Gloria Talbott, etc.), Tobey starred in a spoof originally titled Attack of the B Movie Monster. In 2005, Anthem Pictures released the completed feature version of this spoof on DVD under the new title The Naked Monster. Tobey's scenes in that release were actually shot in 1985, so The Naked Monster is technically his final film credit, being released three years after his death.  He had, however, continued to act throughout most of the 1990s.  One of those notable roles is his performance in the 1994 Star Trek: Deep Space Nine episode "Shadowplay" as Rurigan, an alien who recreates his dead friends as holograms.  Among other examples of Tobey's final decade of work are his two appearances as Judge Kent Watson on the series L.A. Law.

Personal life 
In 1968 Tobey married June Hutton.

In 2002, Tobey died of natural causes at age 85 in Rancho Mirage, California.

Partial filmography

 The Man of the Ferry (1943, short)
 Dangerous Venture (1947) – Red 
 This Time for Keeps (1948) – Redheaded Soldier at Pool (uncredited)
 Beyond Glory (1948) – Bit Role (uncredited)
 He Walked by Night (1948) – Detective Questioning Pete (uncredited)
 The Stratton Story (1949) – Detroit Player (uncredited)
 Illegal Entry (1949) – Dave (uncredited)
 The Great Sinner (1949) – Cabbie (uncredited)
 I Was a Male War Bride (1949) – Red – Seaman (uncredited)
 The Stratton Story (1949)
 Task Force (1949) – Capt. Ken Williamson (uncredited)
 The Doctor and the Girl (1949) – Surgeon at Bellevue (uncredited)
 Free for All (1949) – Pilot
 Twelve O'Clock High (1949) – Sgt. Keller – Guard at Gate (uncredited)
 The File on Thelma Jordon (1950) – Police Photographer (uncredited)
 When Willie Comes Marching Home (1950) – Lt. K. Geiger (uncredited)
 One Way Street (1950) – Cop at Second Accident (uncredited)
 Love That Brute (1950) – Henchman #1 in Cigar Store (uncredited)
 The Gunfighter (1950) – Swede (uncredited)
 My Friend Irma Goes West (1950) – Pilot
 Kiss Tomorrow Goodbye (1950) – Det. Fowler
 Right Cross (1950) – Ken, the Third Reporter
 Three Secrets (1950) – Officer (uncredited)
 The Flying Missile (1950) – Crewman Pete McEvoy
 The Company She Keeps (1951) – Rex Fisher (uncredited)
 Up Front (1951) – Cooper (uncredited)
 Rawhide (1951) – Lt. Wingate (uncredited)
 The Thing from Another World (1951) – Captain Patrick Hendry
 Angel Face (1952) – Bill Crompton
 The Beast from 20,000 Fathoms (1953) – Col. Jack Evans
 Fighter Attack (1953) – George
 The Bigamist (1953) – Tom Morgan, Defense Attorney
 Ring of Fear (1954) – Shreveport
 Down Three Dark Streets (1954) – FBI Agent Zack Stewart
 The Steel Cage (1954) – Steinberg, Convict Painter (segment "The Face")
 Davy Crockett, King of the Wild Frontier (1955) – Colonel Jim Bowie
 Rage at Dawn (1955) – Monk Claxton
 It Came from Beneath the Sea (1955) – Cmdr. Pete Mathews
 Davy Crockett and the River Pirates (1956) – Jocko
 The Steel Jungle (1956) – Dr. Lewy
 The Man in the Grey Flannel Suit (1956) – Lt. Hank Mahoney (uncredited)
 The Great Locomotive Chase (1956) – Anthony Murphy
 The Search for Bridey Murphy (1956) – Rex Simmons
 The Wings of Eagles (1957) – Capt. Herbert Allen Hazard
 Gunfight at the O.K. Corral (1957) – Bat Masterson
 The Vampire (1957) – Sheriff Buck Donnelly
 Jet Pilot (1957) – Sergeant (uncredited)
 Cry Terror! (1958) – Agent Frank Cole (uncredited)
 Bat Masterson! (1960) – Reed Amherst (diamond con man) 
 Seven Ways from Sundown (1960) – Texas Ranger Lieutenant Herly
 Perry Mason (1960) – Deputy D.A. Jack Alvin – S4 E3, the I'll Fated Faker
 X-15 (1961) – Col. Craig Brewster
 Sea Hunt (1961), Season 4, Episode 33
 Stark Fear (1962) – Cliff Kane
 40 Guns to Apache Pass (1966) – Corporal Bodine
 A Man Called Adam (1966) – Club Owner
 A Time for Killing (1967) – Sgt. Cleehan
 Marlowe (1969) – Sgt. Fred Beifus
 Billy Jack (1971) – Deputy Mike 
 Terror in the Sky (1971) – Capt. Wilson
 Ben (1972) – Engineer
 The Candidate (1972) – Floyd J. Starkey
 Rage (1972) – Col. Alan A. Nickerson
 Walking Tall (1973) – Augie McCullah
 Dirty Mary, Crazy Larry (1974) – Sheriff Carl Donahue
 Homebodies (1974) – Construction Boss
 The Missiles of October (1974) – Adm. George W. Anderson Jr., Chief of Naval Operations
 The Wild McCullochs (1975) – Larry Carpenter
 W.C. Fields and Me (1976) – Parker 
 Baby Blue Marine (1976) – Buick Driver
 Gus (1976) – Asst. Warden
 MacArthur (1977) – Admiral Halsey
 Goodbye, Franklin High (1978) – Police Captain
 Hero at Large (1980) – Firechief
 Airplane! (1980) – Air Controller Neubauer
 The Howling (1981) – Older Cop
 Strange Invaders (1983) – Arthur Newman
 Gremlins (1984) – Mobil Gas Station Attendant (uncredited)
 The Lost Empire (1984) – Capt. Hendry
 Innerspace (1987) – Man in Restroom
 Big Top Pee-wee (1988) – Sheriff
 Freeway (1988) – Monsignor Kavanaugh
 Ghost Writer (1989) – Cop #2
 Gremlins 2: The New Batch (1990) – Projectionist
 Desire and Hell at Sunset Motel (1991) – Capt. Holiday
 Honey, I Blew Up the Kid (1992) – Smitty
 Single White Female (1992) – Desk Clerk
 Body Shot (1994) – Arthur Lassen
 Hellraiser: Bloodline (1996) – Hologram-Priest (uncredited)
 The Naked Monster (2005) – Col. Patrick Hendry (final film role)

References

External links

 
 
 
 
 Kenneth Tobey at Film Buff Online.com

1917 births
2002 deaths
American male film actors
American male stage actors
American male television actors
Male actors from Oakland, California
Male actors from Los Angeles
20th-century American male actors
United States Army Air Forces personnel of World War II
United States Army Air Forces soldiers